This is a list of African-American Jews

 Mazi Melesa Pilip, Ethiopian-born American politician

References

See also 

 Jews of Color

 
Jews
African-American Jews